The 2021–22 Liga I was the 32nd season of the top level women's football league of the Romanian football league system. 12 teams played a one legged-round robin. The top 6 teams progressed then to the play-offs, while the bottom 6 teams to the play-out, where a two-legged round-robin took place. Teams ranked 11 and 12 (5 and 6 in the play-out) would relegate directly to the 2022–23 Liga II.

U Olimpia Cluj were the defending champions.

Team changes

To Liga I
Promoted from Liga II
 CSȘ Târgoviște (via play-off in 2020–21 Liga II)
 Ladies Târgu Mureș (via play-off in 2020–21 Liga II)

From Liga I
Relegated to Liga II
 Carmen București (11th place in 2020–21 Liga I)
 Selena ȘN Constanța (12th place in 2020–21 Liga I)

Renamed teams
While still remaining a separate club, in the summer of 2020, ACS Fortuna Becicherecu Mic signed a partnership with ASU Politehnica Timișoara, as a result of which the male Fortuna team became an unofficial satellite of Politehnica's. Therefore, in the summer of 2021, strengthening the partnership between the two clubs, the Fortuna women's team announced that it would use the Politehnica Timișoara branding starting with the 2021–2022 season. 

Following a partnership with the Alexandria municipality, Universitatea Alexandria was renamed as CSM Alexandria. This was achieved by a cession of rights to participate in all competitions from Clubul Sportiv Universitatea Alexandria to Clubul Sportiv Municipal Alexandria.

Due to waning support from authorities of Reșița and Caraș-Severin County, ACS Banat Girls Reșița started a partnership with Comloșu Mare municipality from Timiș County, where they would play all their home matches. As a consequence, the Reșița part of the name was dropped, the team changing its name to just "ACS Banat Girls", thus still continuing to represent the historic Banat region.

Stadiums by capacity and location

Regular season

League table

Championship play-offs
The top six teams from Regular season met twice (10 matches per team) for deciding the league champion and the participant in the 2022–23 UEFA Women's Champions League. Teams start the Championship round with their points from the Regular season, but no other records carried over.

Play-off table

Championship play-out
The bottom six teams from Regular season will met (10 matches per team) for deciding the two relegated teams to the 2021–22 Liga II. Teams start the Play-off round with their points from the Regular season, but no other records carried over.

Play-out table

References

Rom
Fem
Romanian Superliga (women's football) seasons